Devlia is a village and former non-salute Rajput princely state on Saurashtra peninsula in Gujarat, western India.

History 
The petty princely state, in Jhalawar prant, was ruled by Jhala Rajput Chieftains.

In 1901 it comprised its seat town Devlia and one other village, with a combined population of 494, yielding 2,240 Rupees state revenue (1903-4, all from land), paying 523 tribute, to the British and to Junagarh State.

References

External links 
 Imperial Gazetteer, on DSAL.UChicago.edu - Kathiawar

Princely states of Gujarat
Rajput princely states